Alfonso Manzanedo de Quiñones (1552 – 13 November 1627) was a Roman Catholic prelate who served as Titular Patriarch of Jerusalem (1622–1627).

Biography
Alfonso Manzanedo de Quiñones was born in 1552.
On 26 October 1622, he was appointed during the papacy of Pope Gregory XV as Titular Patriarch of Jerusalem.
On 8 December 1622, he was consecrated bishop by Ludovico Ludovisi, Archbishop of Bologna with Luigi Caetani, Coadjutor Archbishop of Capua, and Ulpiano Volpi, Bishop of Novara, serving as co-consecrators. 
He served as Titular Patriarch of Jerusalem until his death on 13 November 1627. 
While bishop, he was the principal co-consecrator of Giovanni Battista Pamphilj, Titular Patriarch of Antioch (1626).

References

External links and additional sources
 (for Chronology of Bishops) 
 (for Chronology of Bishops) 

17th-century Roman Catholic titular bishops
Bishops appointed by Pope Gregory XV
1552 births
1627 deaths
Patriarchs of Jerusalem